Ꝍ (minuscule: ꝍ) is a letter used in a number of Medieval Nordic orthographies including Old Norse, Norwegian, and Icelandic. The letter was used as a scribal abbreviation during the Middle Ages to represent the phonemic /ǫ/, /ø:/, and /ey/.

Computing codes

References 

Typography
Early medieval literature
Latin letters with diacritics